Noah "Shark" Robertson (born July 28, 1983) is an American drummer, comedian, and writer. He is one of the founding members of The Browning. He was also the drummer of Motograter from 2013 to 2017. Robertson is currently the drummer for Jeffrey Nothing, former vocalist and founding member of Mushroomhead.

In July 2011, he founded Swimming With Sharks Records. The label roster includes Eye of the Enemy (Australia) and Hellbent, among other acts from around the world. Past artists include Mouth Of The Serpent, Aechoes, Laconic, Blindfolded and Led To the Woods, among others.

On August 29, 2016 Robertson launched Zombie Shark Records and announced his first signings as Keychain from Montreal and Darkc3ll from Australia. The Zombie Shark Records roster has included Dirty Machine, Keychain, Darkcell, Lethal Injektion, NoSelf, Riksha, The Black Crown, 10/31, Natas Lived, JUNK, The Rift, Promidal, Krehated and more.

In August 2016, Thom Hazaert brought Robertson on as Marketing Director of EMP Label Group, the new record label from David Ellefson of Megadeth fame. Thom is currently serving as Director of Operations and Head of A&R at EMP and has served as a consultant for Zombie Shark Records.

In 2018, Robertson officially began his stand-up comedy career. He made his Comedy Store debut in Hollywood, California on June 4, 2018.

In September 2018, Robertson played drums on a single released by Jeffrey Nothing.

References

Living people
American industrial musicians
1983 births
American heavy metal drummers
Musicians from Texas
American rock drummers
Snot (band) members
21st-century American drummers